The Burrough–Daniel House at 502 W. North in Victoria, Texas was built in 1892.  It was designed by architect Jules Leffland in Late Victorian architecture.  It was listed on the National Register of Historic Places in 1986.

Leffland designed many buildings in Victoria.

See also

National Register of Historic Places listings in Victoria County, Texas

References

Houses on the National Register of Historic Places in Texas
Victorian architecture in Texas
Houses completed in 1892
Houses in Victoria, Texas
National Register of Historic Places in Victoria, Texas